Simulium buissoni, commonly referred to as the black nono or no-no noir des rivières, is a midge species in the genus Simulium found on Nuku Hiva and Eiao, Marquesas archipelago in Polynesia.

References

External links
 Les nonos on www.ilm.pf (French)

buissoni
Insects described in 1906